The black-billed wood hoopoe (Phoeniculus somaliensis) is a species of bird in the family Phoeniculidae. It is native to eastern Africa where it is found in wooded and scrubby areas.

Description
The black-billed wood hoopoe is very similar to the green wood hoopoe (Phoeniculus purpureus) in appearance, but lacks the greenish gloss on the head and mantle and has a black beak rather than a red one, though there is sometimes a reddish tinge at the base of the beak. The plumage is generally black with a bluish or purplish gloss, and a row of white spots on the flight feathers giving a white bar on the wings in flight. The long, graduated tail has white spots at the edge.

Distribution and habitat
It is a bird of woodland, scrubby areas, forest edges, and gallery forests, and among large trees such as Acacias growing in wadis.

Ecology
The black-billed wood hoopoe feeds on arthropods, millipedes, beetles and other invertebrates, foraging on trunks and branches by creeping along the bark, sometimes upside-down, and probing into crevices. It breeds in holes in trees.

Status
The black-billed wood hoopoe is a common bird and has a very wide range. Its population trend has not been quantified but it may be decreasing because the large trees in which it nests are becoming more scarce as a result of being harvested. No other particular threats to this bird are known and the International Union for Conservation of Nature has assessed its conservation status as being of "least concern".

References

black-billed wood hoopoe
Birds of the Horn of Africa
black-billed wood hoopoe
Taxonomy articles created by Polbot